Soe Gewog (Dzongkha: སྲོས་) is a gewog (village block) of Thimphu District, Bhutan. Soe Gewog, along with Naro and Lingzhi Gewogs, is part of Lingzhi Dungkhag.

References

Gewogs of Bhutan
Thimphu District